Jeev Majha Guntala is an Indian Marathi language television drama series which airs on Colors Marathi. The show premiered on 21 June 2021. It is an official remake of Kannada TV series Mithuna Raashi.

Summary 
It is the story of Antara whose family is going through financial crisis. In this situation, along with studies, she also drives a taxi to support her family.

Cast

Main 
 Yogita Chavan as Antara Shitole / Antara Malhar Khanwilkar
 Saorabh Choughule as Malhar Khanvilkar

Recurring 
Malhar's family
 Sumedha Datar as Suhasini Khanwilkar
 Pratiksha Mungekar as Chitra Sudhakar Khanwilkar
 Bharat Daini as Sudhakar Khanwilkar
 Milisha Jadhav as Soumya Sudhakar Khanwilkar
 Ronak Shinde as Megh Khanwilkar
 Bipin Surve replaced Ronak as Megh Khanwilkar (Banti)
 Milind Oak as Aajoba
 Veena Katti as Aaji

Antara's family
 Prajakta Navnale as Shweta Shitole / Shweta Megh Khanwilkar 
 Purva Shinde replaced Prajakta as Shweta Shitole / Shweta Megh Khanwilkar
 Milan Dsouza as Akshata
 Jyoti Date as Manjiri Shitole
 Shweta Mokashi-Kulkarni as Seema
 Ravindra Phaltankar as Keshav

References

External links 
 
 Jeev Majha Guntala at Voot

Marathi-language television shows
2021 Indian television series debuts
Colors Marathi original programming